The Ford government may refer to:

Presidency of Gerald Ford in the United States
Premiership of Doug Ford in Ontario, Canada